Leandro David Fernández (born 23 January 1995) is an Argentine professional footballer who plays as a forward for Racing de Córdoba.

Career
Fernández started his career with Sportivo Belgrano de Almafuerte and Atlético Ascasubi, before heading to Belgrano of the Primera División; making his senior debut on 18 September 2016 in a match with Olimpo. He made one more appearance, versus Unión Santa Fe, before joining Primera B Nacional side Crucero del Norte on loan. His first appearance came on 11 March against Estudiantes, five matches later he scored his first goal in a defeat to Instituto. He scored three times in twenty-one fixtures as Crucero were relegated. Fernández joined Guillermo Brown on loan on 10 September 2017.

Fernández made his Guillermo Brown debut seven days after signing against Instituto on 17 September. He'd appear a total of fourteen times for them. In 2019, Fernández moved to Las Palmas of Torneo Regional Federal Amateur. Six goals followed across fourteen appearances in two seasons there. In August 2020, Fernández moved to fellow fourth tier team Racing de Córdoba.

Career statistics
.

Notes

References

External links
 

1995 births
Living people
Sportspeople from Córdoba Province, Argentina
Argentine footballers
Association football forwards
Argentine Primera División players
Primera Nacional players
Club Atlético Belgrano footballers
Crucero del Norte footballers
Guillermo Brown footballers
Club Atlético Las Palmas players
Racing de Córdoba footballers